is a major producer of flavors and fragrances headquartered in Japan. As of 2021, it is one of world's top ten flavor and fragrances companies.

History
T. Hasegawa was established in 1903 as Hasegawa Totaro Shoten in Tokyo, Japan by Totaro Hasegawa. In 1941, Shozo Hasegawa succeeded his father at the company. In 1961 T. Hasegawa Co., Ltd. was founded with Shozo Hasegawa as president and took over all business of Hasegawa Totaro Shoten. The new company established headquarters in the prestigious Nihon-bashi district of Tokyo.

The strong demand for Hasegawa products resulted in establishing Hasegawa's first overseas production facilities in Lawndale, California in 1978 and the formation of T. Hasegawa USA. In 1989 this production facility moved to the city of Cerritos, California where it is located to this day. On December 18, 1998, Tokujiro Hasegawa, a grandson of Totaro Hasegawa, was appointed President. Shozo Hasegawa was designated as Chairman of the Board, and Mr. Ryoshiro Hayashi as vice chairman.

In March 2000 T. Hasegawa was listed on the Tokyo 2nd stock market, and by March 2001 T. Hasegawa was moved to the Tokyo 1st stock market.

References

External links
T. Hasegawa official website 
T. Hasegawa USA official website 

Cosmetics companies of Japan
Fragrance companies
Flavor companies
Food and drink companies of Japan
Chemical companies based in Tokyo
Companies listed on the Tokyo Stock Exchange
Chemical companies established in 1903
Japanese companies established in 1903
Japanese brands